Bingham is a populated place in Socorro County, New Mexico, United States. It lies at an elevation of  along Highway 380, halfway between San Antonio and Carrizozo.

References 

Populated places in New Mexico